The 2018–19 Saudi Second Division was the 43rd season of the Saudi Second Division since its establishment in 1996. Fixtures were released on 4 September 2018 and the opening round of matches was played on 19 October 2018. The league season ended on 13 April 2019 with the final.

On 13 April 2019, Hetten defeated Al-Bukayriyah 1–0 in the final to win their first title.

Overview

Changes
On 7 March 2018, the Saudi FF announced that the league would be increased from 20 teams to 24 teams, divided into 2 groups of 12 teams.

Team changes
A total of 24 teams are contesting the league, including 9 sides from the 2017–18 season, 1 relegated team from the MS League, 10 promoted teams from the 2017–18 Third Division, and four winners from the 2017–18 relegation playoffs.

The following teams have changed division since the 2017–18 season

To Second Division

Promoted from the Third Division

 Al-Akhdoud
 Al-Dera'a
 Al-Jandal
 Al-Arabi
 Al-Sahel
 Al-Bukayriyah
 Al-Hait
 Arar
 Al-Ghazwah
 Al-Sadd
 Afif

Relegated from MS League
 Al-Watani

From Second Division
Promoted to MS League
 Al-Washm
 Al-Jabalain
 Al-Jeel
 Al-Ansar
 Al-Ain
 Al-Adalh
 Abha

Relegated to the Third Division
 Al-Badaya

Teams
;Group A

1:  Al-Akhdoud will play at Prince Sultan bin Abdul Aziz Stadium due to the ongoing war in Yemen

Group B

Foreign players
The number of foreign players is limited to 2 per team.

Players name in bold indicates the player is registered during the mid-season transfer window.

Group A
Table

Group B
Table

Third place play-off
Al-Taqadom, who finished 2nd in Group A faced Al-Thoqbah who finished 2nd in Group B to decide the third-placed team. Al-Thoqbah defeated Al-Taqadom 3–1 after extra time to finish in third place.

Final
The winners of each group will play a one-legged final to decide the champion of the 2018–19 Second Division. As winners of Group A, Al-Bukayriyah faced Hetten, the winners of Group B. The match was scheduled to be played on 12 April 2019, but was abandoned after 32 minutes due to heavy snowfall. Hetten won the match 1–0 and won their first ever Second Division title.

The match was abandoned after 32 minutes due to heavy snowfall, and was resumed on 13 April 2019, 16:00, from the point of abandonment.

Statistics

Top scorers

Hat-tricks 

Note
(H) – Home; (A) – Away4 Player scored 4 goals

See also
 2018–19 Professional League
 2018–19 Prince Mohammad bin Salman League
 2019 King Cup
 2018 Super Cup

References

Saudi Second Division seasons
3